Avanj (also Romanized as  Āvanj and Evanj) is a village in Olya Rural District, in the Central District of Ardestan County, Isfahan Province, Iran.

At the 2006 census, its population was 112, in 50 families.

References 

Populated places in Ardestan County